The Bharwad, also known as Gadaria, are a Hindu caste found in the state of Gujarat in India, primarily engaged in herding livestock.

History 
The Bharwads claim they are the descendants of (Hinduism). According to Sudipta Mitra, historians believe the Bharwards arrived in northern Gujarat in the 10th century, fleeing the Muslim invasions of Sindh. They then spread out throughout Saurashtra.

Divisions 
Of the various reasons given for the division between Motabhai and Nanabhai, the most popular is that  brothers were ordered by Krishna to take their flocks to different places. The older of the brothers went on to marry a Bharwad woman while the other married a other woman. Since the latter was a marriage outside the community, the offspring were deemed to be ritually polluted. Thus the Motabhai (literally, "big brother") descend from the first and the Nanabhai ("little brother") from the latter.

Varna and socio-economic status 
Mitra notes that they are generally considered to be among the lowest of the pastoral castes, being engaged primarily in the herding of goats and sheep. However, although one of the Maldhari nomadic communities, they are also among the most urbanised of the region and, combined with their niche position in the supply of milk, which forms their main source of income, this has enabled them to improve their traditional social position.

Customs

Family arrangements 
There is anecdotal evidence that pet chandla (marriage of children while they are still in the womb) is practised by some members of the community. In other cases, a sagai (engagement) ceremony takes place when children are aged 2–3, with the marriage age usually being between 18-20 for women and 20-22 for men.

Clothing 
The Bharwads practice "sartorial conservatism", according to Emma Tarlo, and it is not enough to be born a Bharwad if a person wants to be accepted as one: conforming with standards of dress and other customs is a necessity if a person is not to be considered a deserter from the community. The details of clothing — in terms of style, colour and material — have changed over time while retaining a distinct Bharwad character. Despite it being a relatively recent practice, the wearing of pink and red shawls by both women and men is one of the most obvious identifiers of the modern community and they are worn even by those who shun the other aspects of the Bharwadi dress code in favour of Western styles. The desire to identify through clothing and also through tattoos may be a reflection of the community's traditional itinerant lifestyle, whereby a means of recognising their fellows was a significant social factor.

The clothing worn by Bharwad women was traditionally made from coarse wool woven by members of local untouchable communities. In addition, they embroidered their own open-backed bodices. The garments at that time — as late as the early 20th century — comprised the bodice, an unstitched black or red waist-cloth, known as a jimi, and a veil. Motabhai clothing was made from thicker wool than that of the Nanabhai, leading to the two groups referring to themselves as "thick cloth" and "thin cloth". The veil was dyed black and bore red dots if the woman was a Motabhai and yellow if she was Nanabhai. While the styles and colours remain similar, modern Bharwad women use man-made fibres, such as polyester, and cotton. This change may be in part because the modern materials are of finer texture but it is more likely than it came about because of their relative cheapness. Cost is an important factor among the generally penurious community and women could sell the woollen fabric that they had used for clothing for a greater price than they paid for the replacement man-made fabric clothes. Tarlo quotes a Bharwad woman saying that "If you wear a sari then you can no longer be called a Bharwad. That is the way it is among our caste. Better to die than change your clothes."

The men commonly wear a silver ear-ring, called a variya, and a pagri (turban). The length of the turban differs between the two divisions, and there are numerous ways of tying them. A white turban, rather than the more usual pink or red, is a symbol of seniority. Wearing Western-style clothing is still not generally accepted but the traditional three woollen blankets, worn around the head, waist and shoulders, have in many cases been replaced by a cotton kediyu together with a dhoti or chorni. As with the women, Carol Henderson notes that

Occupations 

Bharwads are rarely educated beyond primary level and literacy rates are poor. Many of them live in and around the Gir Forest National Park, where they tend to keep away from the forest itself when grazing their livestock due to the danger of attacks by Asiatic lions. Aside from their involvement with livestock, the main source of income is agricultural labouring; few of them own land.

Classification
Bharwads are classified in Gujarat as Other Backward Class, except in the Nesses of the forests of Alech, Barada and Gir where they are Scheduled Tribes.

See also 
 https://en.m.wikipedia.org/wiki/Gadaria
 Dhangar
 List of Scheduled Tribes in India

References 
Notes

Citations

Bibliography

Tribal communities of Gujarat
Maldhari communities
Tribes of Kutch
Herding castes